The 2008–09 DFB-Pokal was the 66th season of the annual German football cup competition. The competition began with the first round on 7 August 2008, and ended with Werder Bremen defeating Bayer Leverkusen, who for their part eliminated defending champions Bayern Munich in the quarter-finals, in the final at the Olympiastadion, Berlin on 30 May 2009. The winners of the 2008–09 DFB-Pokal would qualify to the fourth qualifying round of the 2009–10 UEFA Europa League.

Due to a decision made in 2006, reserve teams from professional clubs are no longer allowed to compete.

Participating clubs
The following 64 teams competed in the first round:

Draw
The draws for the different rounds were conducted as following: For the first round, the participating teams were split into two pots. The first pot contained all teams which have qualified through their regional cup competitions, the teams which were promoted from the Regionalligen and the bottom four teams of the Second Bundesliga. Every team from this pot was drawn to a team from the second pot, which contained all remaining professional teams. The teams from the first pot were set as the home team in the process.

The two-pot scenario was also applied for the second round, with the remaining amateur teams in the first pot and the remaining professional teams in the other pot. Once one pot was empty, the remaining pairings were drawn from the other pot with the first-drawn team for a match serving as hosts. For the remaining rounds, the draw was conducted from just one pot. Any remaining amateur team were assigned as the home team if drawn against a professional team. In every other case, the first-drawn team served as hosts.

Matches

First round
The draw for the first round was held on 6 July 2008. Matches were played between 7 and 10 August 2008.

Source: kicker.de

Second round
The draw for the second round was conducted on 24 August 2008. The games were played on 23 and 24 September 2008.

Source: kicker.de

Round of 16
The draw for the round of 16 was conducted on 5 October 2008. The games were played on 27 and 28 January 2009.

Last updated: 28 January 2009Source: kicker.de

Quarter-finals
The draw was conducted on 1 February 2009.

Semi-finals
The draw was conducted on 7 March 2009.

Final

References

External links
 
DFB-Pokal on kicker.de 

2008-09
2008–09 in German football cups